Oak Lawn is a village in Cook County, Illinois, United States.  The population was 58,362 at the 2020 census. Oak Lawn is a suburb of Chicago, located southwest of the city. It shares borders with the city in two areas but is surrounded mostly by other suburbs.

History

Founding
In August 1835, James B. Campbell purchased the land stretching between Cicero Avenue and Central Avenue from 95th Street to 103rd Street. It is unclear what Campbell's intentions with the area were, but by 1840, he had lost a court battle with the Illinois State Bank and his land was sold in a public auction. John Simpson, a prominent figure in early Oak Lawn history, bought the northern half of the property in 1842. By 1859, the recently incorporated government of Worth Township paid for the construction of Black Oak Grove Road, an early name for 95th Street. Black Oak Grove is also the earliest known name of the area that would become Oak Lawn. It was later shortened to Black Oak or Black Oaks, but in 1882, the post office, train depot and surrounding community became known simply as Oak Lawn. Before this however, the area now known as Oak Lawn was, briefly during the early 1800s, called Agnes. It was also on some occasion referred to as Oak Park. Over the next two decades, the area grew in population as more homes were built and local business sprang into being. As the area continued to grow, many residents visited Englewood by train to shop. Oak Lawn residents also made income during early days by selling their farm and dairy products to various markets in Chicago.

Incorporation
In 1909, Oak Lawn was incorporated as a village. The following years, there were major improvements to local infrastructure and government services, such as the introduction of the police magistrate and village marshal, along with the building of a village hall and jailhouse. Electric lights were brought to 95th Street in 1911, the volunteer fire department began in 1923, Oak Lawn's first bank opened in 1925, and the Community High School District 218 was formed. The population had grown to 2,045 by 1930, and civic improvements were steadily made over the next decade. In 1934, a collection of one hundred books was the beginning of the Oak Lawn Public Library. By 1935, President Franklin D. Roosevelt created the Works Progress Administration as part of the New Deal, which supported a variety of public works, including libraries. With the help of a WPA grant, the new library opened its doors in 1936.

Post 1945 
After World War II, with veterans returning home and taking advantage of the G.I. Bill, Oak Lawn experienced a major population boom. Beginning in 1949, Oak Lawn Round-Up Days became an annual event and helped to promote the village. It started with 25,000 people, and the Western-themed celebration brought in over 100,000 attendees in 1952. In this year, Jack Brickhouse was master of ceremonies, and the parade was televised on WGN-TV. By 1957, Round-Up Days had become too large, and the next year a final scaled-down version was held.

In the 1950s, a village managerial government began, and a new library and fire station were constructed. By 1960, there were nearly 20,000 residents in Oak Lawn.

On April 21, 1967, a tornado touched down in Oak Lawn that is recorded as one of the worst to strike an urban area. Roughly 900 buildings were damaged or destroyed, and over 30 people were killed.

The town was rebuilt in the coming years, and witnessed further population growth, peaking at 63,500 between 1973 and 1976. However, there was a decrease in residents in the 1980s, and an aging population led to the closure of several schools during this time. In response, the village began a process of redevelopment to counteract the decrease. This redevelopment has focused primarily on businesses and structures in the core area of Oak Lawn, around 95th Street between Cicero Avenue and Central Avenue.

1967 tornado 

There were no deaths in Palos Hills, although a number of homes were destroyed and two transmission towers collapsed. After rising from the ground, the tornado touched down again at the Starlite Drive-In Theater at 6400 West 95th Street. After cutting Oak Lawn Community High School in half, it caused damage to St. Gerald's and continued to 91st Street and Cicero Avenue, heavily damaging the Airway Trailer Park and the Oak Lawn Roller Rink before rising from ground level. It touched down again in nearby Hometown, Evergreen Park, and Chicago before dissipating over Lake Michigan. In just 16 minutes, the storm left a  path of destruction and over 30 people dead.

Downtown redevelopment 

Starting in 2002, downtown Oak Lawn (95th Street between Tulley Avenue and 55th Court) became the target of a massive redevelopment program; properties on the north and south sides of 95th Street were demolished. Eventually, several square blocks were leveled, making room for several multistory, high-end condominium complexes with retail space on the main floors. Part of the project was the expansion of the Metra commuter train station that houses a retail/office center and a new  children's museum. This complex also includes a multistory parking garage. Downtown Oak Lawn as seen today bears little resemblance to the downtown from 2002. It now features modern high-rise buildings, new shopping areas, a large contemporary Metra train station, and several new retail and service facilities.

Geography 

Demographics 
As of the 2020 census there were 58,362 people, 21,154 households, and 13,544 families residing in the village. The racial makeup of the village was 68.31% White, 7.65% African American, 0.87% Native American, 2.83% Asian, 0.02% Pacific Islander, 9.43% from other races, and 10.89% from two or more races. Hispanic or Latino of any race were 22.56% of the population.

There were 21,154 households, out of which 48.24% had children under the age of 18 living with them, 46.89% were married couples living together, 11.64% had a female householder with no husband present, and 35.97% were non-families. 32.16% of all households were made up of individuals, and 15.73% had someone living alone who was 65 years of age or older. The average household size was 3.33 and the average family size was 2.60.

The village's age distribution consisted of 21.7% under the age of 18, 7.0% from 18 to 24, 25.3% from 25 to 44, 27.6% from 45 to 64, and 18.5% who were 65 years of age or older. The median age was 41.0 years. For every 100 females, there were 96.5 males. For every 100 females age 18 and over, there were 91.8 males.

The median income for a household in the village was $69,352, and the median income for a family was $90,690. Males had a median income of $54,168 versus $38,363 for females. The per capita income for the village was $33,998. About 7.5% of families and 10.1% of the population were below the poverty line, including 13.2% of those under age 18 and 9.6% of those age 65 or over.

Note: the US Census treats Hispanic/Latino as an ethnic category. This table excludes Latinos from the racial categories and assigns them to a separate category. Hispanics/Latinos can be of any race.

Parks and recreation

Oak Lawn maintains an expansive park system. These include playgrounds, walking paths, baseball fields, basketball, volleyball and tennis courts, plus outdoor swimming pools, an indoor ice arena, two fitness centers, and an 18-hole golf course. Each area in Oak Lawn has its own recreational area, totaling 22 parks.

Education 

Oak Lawn has public education schooling children from K–5 in its many elementary schools, including Kolb, Lieb, Harnew, Columbus Manor, Covington, Hannum, Hometown, Kolmar, and Sward. Oak Lawn has two public middle schools:  Simmons Middle School, and Oak Lawn-Hometown Middle School.

There are two public high schools, Oak Lawn Community High School and Harold L. Richards High School.

The Roman Catholic Archdiocese of Chicago operates Catholic schools. Catholic grammar schools include St. Germaine, St. Catherine, St. Linus, and St. Gerald. St. Louis de Montfort School closed in 2017 with 133 students that year.

Infrastructure

Stop sign program
In mid-2007, Oak Lawn began hanging additional messages to village stop signs in an attempt to have drivers obey the signs. The signs were the idea of the village President and local residents were encouraged to submit their own ideas. Found throughout the village, the signs garnered attention with the press and were not well received by residents, nor did they noticeably impact public safety. While considered humorous by some, many others considered it a publicity stunt at tax payer's expense.

The Federal Highway Administration (FHWA) and IDOT voiced their concerns about the use of these nonconforming stop signs and the village removed them in April 2008. Initially, the Village President refused to remove the signs until IDOT threatened to withhold millions of dollars in funding for infrastructure.

Notable people 

 Diandra Asbaty (born 1980), professional bowler; Team USA member and spokesperson for USBC
 Brian Bogusevic (born 1984), former outfielder for Chicago Cubs
 Tim Byrdak (born 1973), Major League Baseball pitcher 1998 to 2013; born in Oak Lawn
 Kevin Cronin (born 1951), lead vocalist for rock band REO Speedwagon
 David Diehl (born 1980), football player, two-time Super Bowl champion for New York Giants
 Mark Donahue, football player, lineman for Cincinnati Bengals, two-time Consensus All-American at University of Michigan
 Dan Donegan, guitarist for rock band Disturbed
 John Joseph Duda, actor; born in Oak Lawn
 Michael Flatley (born 1958), Irish step dancer; attended St. Linus and Brother Rice High School
 Jack Gwynne, illusionist and actor, died in Oak Lawn (1969)
 David A. Johnston, volcanologist, killed during 1980 Mount St. Helens eruption
 Benn Jordan, recording artist known as The Flashbulb; attended Oak Lawn Community High School
 C.J. Kupec, basketball player, Oak Lawn High School star, played for Michigan and NBA's Los Angeles Lakers
 Rob Mackowiak, player for several Major League Baseball teams
 Bobby Madritsch, former pitcher for Seattle Mariners
 Rory Markham, UFC and IFL mixed martial arts fighter
 Mike Mollo, heavyweight boxer
 Bryan Rekar, former pitcher for Colorado Rockies, Tampa Bay Devil Rays, and Kansas City Royals; born in Oak Lawn
 Michael A. Ruddy, Illinois state representative and businessman, lived in Oak Lawn
 Marc Rzepczynski, pitcher for Seattle Mariners; born in Oak Lawn
 Dwyane Wade, former NBA player and three-time NBA champion with Miami Heat, attended Richards High School in Oak Lawn
 Harry Yourell, Illinois state representative and businessman
 Kanye West, musician, rapper, singer, songwriter, record producer, and fashion designer
 Juice WRLD, rapper, died in Oak Lawn (2019)

References

External links 
Village of Oak Lawn official website
Oak Lawn Chamber of Commerce

 
Villages in Illinois
Chicago metropolitan area
Villages in Cook County, Illinois
Populated places established in 1909
1909 establishments in Illinois